Erik Olsson may refer to:
 Erik Olsson (footballer)
 Erik Olsson (wrestler)

See also
 Erik Olson, Swedish artist
 Erik Olson (American football)
 Eric Olson (disambiguation)